Co-Operative is an unincorporated community and  coal town in McCreary County, Kentucky, United States. Their post office  closed in 1984.

Co-Operative has been noted for its unusual place name.

References

Unincorporated communities in McCreary County, Kentucky
Unincorporated communities in Kentucky
Coal towns in Kentucky